District 5 of the Oregon State Senate comprises all of Lincoln County on the central Oregon Coast, as well as parts of Tillamook, Yamhill, Polk, Lane, Douglas, and Coos counties. It is currently represented by Republican Dick Anderson.

Election results
District boundaries have changed over time, therefore, senators before 2013 may not represent the same constituency as today. From 1993 until 2003, the district covered central Washington County, and from 2003 until 2013 it covered a slightly different area on the Oregon coast.

References

05
Coos County, Oregon
Douglas County, Oregon
Lane County, Oregon
Lincoln County, Oregon
Polk County, Oregon
Tillamook County, Oregon
Yamhill County, Oregon